Conophytum minimum is a small South African species of succulent plant of the genus Conophytum.

Description
Small, highly patterned, mat-forming succulent, with a flattened (truncated) or slightly convex, rounded body-shape.

It is covered with distinctive lines, and the wittebergense variety has especially strong markings.

It is closely related to its neighbouring species Conophytum joubertii, Conophytum ficiforme, Conophytum piluliforme, and to the widespread Conophytum truncatum.

Distribution and habitat

This species is indigenous to the far south-western corner of the Great Karoo region, in the Western Cape of South Africa, in the Ceres Karoo and around Laingsburg.

They grow primarily in the winter, when rainfall swells them. After flowering, they go into dormancy through the summer, when they are covered in a dry papery sheath. They inhabit extremely well-drained soil, in spots protected by rocks or bushes. They split and crack if they receive too much water.

References

Further reading
Hammer,S.(2002) Dumpling and his wife: New views of the genus Conophytum EAE Creative Colour Ltd. .
Hammer,S.(1993) The genus Conophytum : A Conograph Succulent Plant Publications, Pretoria. .
National Botanical Institute of South Africa.(1993) List of Southern African Succulent Plants Umdaus Press.

External links

minimum
Endemic flora of South Africa
Flora of the Cape Provinces
Karoo
Plants described in 1922
Taxa named by N. E. Brown
Taxa named by Carl Peter Thunberg